Australia participated in the Junior Eurovision Song Contest 2017 which took place on 25 November 2017, in Tbilisi, Georgia. The Australian broadcaster ABC is responsible for choosing their entry for the contest. Isabella Clarke was internally selected to represent Australia in Georgia. Her song for the contest, "Speak Up", was revealed on 7 October 2017.

Background

In , Alexa Curtis represented Australia with the song "We Are", achieving fifth place.

Before Junior Eurovision
On 10 September 2017, it was announced that Isabella Clarke had been internally chosen by the broadcaster to represent Australia. Isabella's song "Speak Up" was revealed on 7 October 2017.

Artist and song information

Isabella Clarke
Isabella Clarke (born 31 May 2004) is an Australian singer who represented Australia at the  Junior Eurovision Song Contest with the song "Speak Up". She started singing when she was nine. The last 2 years she has performed at The Victorian State Schools Spectacular in Australia

At Junior Eurovision
During the opening ceremony and the running order draw which took place on 20 November 2017, Australia was drawn to perform fifteenth on 26 November 2017, following Serbia and preceding Italy.

Voting

Detailed voting results

References

Junior Eurovision Song Contest
Australia
Junior